Oscar Alex Enrique Schnake Vergara (11 June 1899 – 24 April 1976) was a Chilean politician and physician. He was a founder member of the Chilean Socialist Party and close to President Pedro Aguirre Cerda (1938–1941).

He has been described as one of the notorious leaders of the Chilean socialdemocracy.

His wife, Gabriela Contreras de Schnake, was mayor of Santiago Centro in early 1940s.

Biography
In 1933, alongside Eugenio González Rojas, with whom showed his anarchist affiliation, founded the collective Acción Revolucionaria Socialista (ARS). Then, this association and another three merged into the current Socialist Party of Chile in April 1933, so that he was a founder member next to Marmaduke Grove, Eugenio Matte, Salvador Allende and González Rojas.

He was the organizer of the Left Block, a political coalition which reunited left-wing political forces other with the exception of the Communist Party (PC) or the centrist Radical Party (PR). Nevertheless, the rising of both President Arturo Alessandri Palma's liberal-conservative right and Chilean nazis (MNSCh, «nacis») forced him to seal an alliance with the PC and the PR. That way, it was established Popular Front of Chile, whose leader was Pedro Aguirre Cerda, who triumphed the 1938 Chilean presidential election over liberal-manchesterian economist Gustavo Ross Santa María.

In 1948, he was part of the Chilean Anticommunist Action board.

After 1973 coup d'état led by Augusto Pinochet, his nephew Eric suffered persecution under Chilean dictatorship.

He died in 1976 away from the political life as did his friend González Rojas. A year later, Raúl Ampuero made a tribute entitled «Óscar Schnake and Eugenio González: Not only history».

Pictures

References

Further reading

 Ponce Duran, Pedro. Oscar Schnake Vergara. Comienzos Del Socialismo Chileno, 1933–1942. Ediciones Documentas. Santiago.  1994
 Moraga Valle, Fabio. "Muchachos casi silvestres". La Federación de Estudiantes y el movimiento estudiantil chileno, 1906–1936, Santiago, Universidad de Chile, 2007.

External links
 Profile at Biblioteca Nacional del Congreso

1899 births
1976 deaths
Chilean people
University of Chile alumni
Socialist Party of Chile politicians
Chilean anti-communists